Darren Charles Bishop (born 16 February 1968) is an English former professional footballer who played as a defender. He played in the Football League for Bury, Barnsley, Preston North End, Burnley, Wigan Athletic and Northampton Town, making more than 350 senior appearances.

Playing career
Born in Nottingham, Bishop started his playing career as an apprentice at Stoke City before joining Watford in April 1986, but he did not make a senior appearance for either club. He signed for Bury ahead of the 1987–88 season and went on to score six goals in 114 league matches for the side. In the summer of 1991 Bishop transferred to Second Division outfit Barnsley for a fee of £50,000. He spent five years with the Oakwell club, making more than 150 first-team appearances in all competitions and scoring once. He lost his first-team place to Steve Davis during his final season with Barnsley and was consequently loaned out on two occasions, firstly to Preston North End, where he played four league matches, before joining Burnley on the last day of the 1996 transfer window.

Bishop made his debut for Burnley on 30 March 1996 in the 1–4 away defeat to Wycombe Wanderers, taking the place of Chris Vinnicombe, who was out with a broken ankle. He played eight more matches for the Lancashire club before leaving at the end of the 1995–96 season. Burnley manager Adrian Heath considered signing Bishop on a permanent deal that summer but the player instead moved to Wigan Athletic for a transfer fee of £20,000. He made 32 appearances for the club before joining Northampton Town for the same fee in December 1997, where he played 12 league games during an 18-month spell. Bishop ended his playing career with a spell at non-league Ilkeston Town before retiring from football in 2000.

Managerial career
Towards the end of the 2000–01 season, Bishop was one of a trio of managers alongside Chris Marples and former Burnley teammate Ian Helliwell hired by Ilkeston Town, who then played in Southern League Premier Division, to save the club from relegation. The task was achieved successfully and Marples was consequently given the managerial role on a permanent basis while Helliwell returned to his playing role and Bishop left the club. In October 2002, Bishop was appointed manager of Ilkeston for a second time with fellow former player John Knapper as his assistant. The pair took over from John McGinlay, who had been sacked the previous week. The team were relegated during his first season in charge to the Southern League Western Division. Ilkeston started the following campaign well but following a run of poor form which included five defeats in six matches, Bishop was dismissed and Phil Stant was brought in as his replacement.

Career statistics
Source:

References

External links

1968 births
Living people
Footballers from Nottingham
English footballers
Association football defenders
Stoke City F.C. players
Watford F.C. players
Bury F.C. players
Barnsley F.C. players
Preston North End F.C. players
Burnley F.C. players
Wigan Athletic F.C. players
Northampton Town F.C. players
Ilkeston Town F.C. (1945) players
English football managers
Ilkeston Town F.C. managers
English Football League players